The Jalapa river (also known as Río El Tambor or Río Chimalapea) is a river in the south of Guatemala.

References

External links
Map of Guatemala including the river

Rivers of Guatemala
Geography of Mesoamerica